Topkinsky District is an administrative district (raion), one of the nineteen in Kemerovo Oblast, Russia. As a municipal division, it is incorporated as Topkinsky Municipal District. It is located in the northwest of the oblast. Its administrative center is the town of Topki (which is not administratively a part of the district). Population:  18,077 (2002 Census);

Administrative and municipal status
Within the framework of administrative divisions, Topkinsky District is one of the nineteen in the oblast. The town of Topki serves as its administrative center, despite being incorporated separately as a town under oblast jurisdiction—an administrative unit with the status equal to that of the districts.

As a municipal division, the district is incorporated as Topkinsky Municipal District, with Topki Town Under Oblast Jurisdiction being incorporated within it as Topkinskoye Urban Settlement.

References

Sources

Districts of Kemerovo Oblast
